The list of ship launches in 2019 includes a chronological list of ships launched or scheduled to be launched in 2019.

Launched

References

2019
Ship launches
 
Ship launches